Feltham and Heston is a constituency created in 1974 represented in the House of Commons of the UK Parliament. Its MP since 2011 is Seema Malhotra of the Labour Co-operative Party, which is in political union with the Labour Party.

History 
The seat has been confined throughout to the western electoral half of the London Borough of Hounslow. Its main predecessor seat was Feltham, comprising Feltham, Bedfont, Hanworth, Hounslow Heath and Cranford; the other direct forerunner Heston and Isleworth contributed its former westernmost settlements: Heston and Hounslow West.  Before 1945 about a third of the present area and half of its then-population were in the Twickenham seat (formed in 1885), the remainder, Feltham, Hanworth and Bedfont were in the Spelthorne seat (formed in 1918 from the southern part of Uxbridge (UK Parliament constituency)).

Constituency profile
Proximity of gravel to the surface of the near-flat land — see Hounslow Heath — restricted productivity and diversity of plant life across the constituency and caused initially cheap land values, a factor which led the area to significant industrial use since the mid-19th century and construction of London Heathrow Airport, the area's largest employer including its many import/export businesses.  The area at central Feltham and on the busy and the somewhat slower (to Central London) Piccadilly line at two tube stations in the north connects into London and the latter also connects to Heathrow Airport.

This part of the Borough of Hounslow since 1955 has the great majority of its  of Metropolitan Green Belt, forming an immediate buffer zone for all of Greater London.  The M4 motorway and dualled parts of the A4, A30 and A316 roads run close to a significant minority of homes. Many local initiatives seek to abate pollution in the Borough and other have successfully attracted major retail and leisure into Feltham and Hounslow, both of which were large villages rather than market towns in the 18th and 19th centuries.

Political history 
The seat has been held by the Labour Party from 1992 onwards, with their highest margin of victory being 35% in 2001, and lowest margin of victory being 3.3%, in 1992. The Conservatives have finished in second place at each general election since.

The current MP Seema Malhotra (Labour Co-operative) was first elected at the 2011 by-election after the death of the previous Labour MP Alan Keen, who had won the seat from Patrick Ground of the Conservatives in 1992.

Today, the seat is a reasonably safe seat for the Labour Party. Although Labour's majority was halved in the 2019 election, the seat was still retained by nearly 8,000 votes.

Boundaries 

Feltham and Heston covers the western half of the London Borough of Hounslow.  Feltham occupies the southern part of the L-shape formed by the borough. Heston occupies the far north bounded by the M4 motorway. In the south of the constituency is Hanworth, with Bedfont in the far west — both are postally parts of Feltham.

1974–1997: The London Borough of Hounslow wards of Cranford, East Bedfont, Feltham Central, Feltham North, Feltham South, Hanworth, 
Heston Central, Heston East, Heston West, Hounslow Heath, and Hounslow West.

The current electoral wards are: 
Bedfont, Cranford, Feltham North, Feltham West, Hanworth, Hanworth Park, Heston Central, Heston East, Heston West and Hounslow West in the London Borough of Hounslow

The London Borough of Hounslow's eastern half is the Brentford and Isleworth seat.

Constituency profile
The constituency is lower on the socio-economic scales than those in neighbouring Brentford and Isleworth. There is higher proportion of social housing, though unemployment is proportionally low by London standards. The seat also includes the western part of the slightly larger urban centre, Hounslow.

The constituency is to the southeast of London Heathrow Airport where many local constituents work, and small storage, distribution businesses are a feature of this half of the borough, as well as light industry and office accommodation.  Next to Cranford on the A4 Bath Road are most of the luxury airport hotels, and an imposing 1998 conversion of an office tower into a hotel in Feltham's linear town centre.  The seat includes a Young Offenders Institution, small business and industrial park and a motorway service station. Across all wards, car ownership is much higher than the London average; for the small proportion of people (who work in the City), Feltham railway station, Hounslow West Underground station, Hounslow Central Underground station and Hatton Cross Underground station provide good links from several areas to the capital.

Members of Parliament

Election results

Elections in the 2010s

Elections in the 2000s

Elections in the 1990s

Elections in the 1980s

Elections in the 1970s

See also 
 List of parliamentary constituencies in London

Notes

References

External links 
Politics Resources (Election results from 1922 onwards)
Electoral Calculus (Election results from 1955 onwards)

Politics of the London Borough of Hounslow
Parliamentary constituencies in London
Constituencies of the Parliament of the United Kingdom established in 1974